Narre Warren East is a small town located just outside of the Melbourne metropolitan area in Victoria, Australia, 38 km south-east of Melbourne's central business district, located within the Shire of Yarra Ranges local government area.

Despite its name, Narre Warren East is actually located in a north-easterly direction from Narre Warren North. It is also separated from the rest of the Narre Warrens, which are a part of the City of Casey.

Narre Warren East Post Office was short-lived operating in 1911 and 1912.

The Narre Warren East public hall is located on Berwick Road.

Kerrs Park is located in Narre Warren East. Muddy Creek, a tributary of Cardinia Creek flows through the reserve.

Narre Warren East has an Active Fire Brigade (CFA) with two appliances servicing the local and surrounding areas.

References

Suburbs of Melbourne
Suburbs of Yarra Ranges